Kang Kwang-bae (Korean: 강광배, Hanja: 姜光倍, born July 29, 1973) is a South Korean retired bobsledder, skeleton racer, and luger. Competing in four Winter Olympics, he earned his best finish of 19th in the four-man bobsleigh event at Vancouver in the 2010 games.

Kang's best finish at the IBSF  World Championships was 26th in four-man bobsleigh at Königssee in the 2004 competition.

Kang was flag bearer for South Korea at the 2010 Winter Olympics.

References
 
 
 profile from Skeletonsport.com

1973 births
Bobsledders at the 2010 Winter Olympics
Living people
Lugers at the 1998 Winter Olympics
Olympic lugers of South Korea
Olympic skeleton racers of South Korea
Olympic bobsledders of South Korea
Skeleton racers at the 2002 Winter Olympics
Skeleton racers at the 2006 Winter Olympics
South Korean male bobsledders
South Korean male lugers
South Korean male skeleton racers
South Korean Buddhists
Academic staff of Korea National Sport University